Igor Grigorenko (born April 9, 1983) is a Russian former professional ice hockey right winger who played almost exclusively in the Kontinental Hockey League (KHL). He currently serves as the general director of Dinamo-Samara.

Playing career
In 2001, Grigorenko was a member of the Russian World U-18 team. At the tournament he finished second overall in the tournament scoring and was also named to the tournament's first All Star team, he was drafted 62nd overall in the 2001 NHL Entry Draft by the Detroit Red Wings.

In 2002–03, Grigorenko was the leading scorer with Lada in the Russian Super League with 19 goals and 29 points in 47 regular season games. His 19 goals were also among the top three goal scorers in the league.

Grigorenko helped Russia win the gold at the 2003 World Junior Ice Hockey Championships and earned championship game MVP honors.

His success with Lada gave him the opportunity to make his debut with the Russian senior national team. Grigorenko posted 7 goals and 8 points in 17 games with the team, including 2 goals and an assist in 7 games at the 2003 Men's World Ice Hockey Championships.

On May 16, 2003, Grigorenko was involved in a serious car accident. He suffered a broken left thigh bone and two fractures in his left shin bone. In addition, complications arose and he developed a fat embolism in his left lung, which is a potentially fatal condition.

Mark Lapush, Grigorenko's agent, said, "They gave him a 10-percent chance to be alive, and he made it. He’s feeling good. He said, 'Mark, trust me, I’m going to play hockey. I’m going to play for Detroit.'"

He signed a one-year, entry-level contract with the Detroit Red Wings in May, 2007, but was unable to make the team out of training camp.  After 5 games in the American Hockey League with affiliate the Grand Rapids Griffins, Grigorenko returned to Russia.

During the 2012–13 season, after scoring 5 points in 12 games, Grigorenko was traded from to Salavat Yulaev Ufa to CSKA Moscow in exchange for Denis Parshin on October 10, 2012.

Following the 2017–18 season with Metallurg Magnitogorsk, his 17th professional campaign, Grigorenko announced his retirement on June 7, 2018.

Career statistics

Regular season and playoffs

International

References

External links

1983 births
Detroit Red Wings draft picks
Grand Rapids Griffins players
HC CSKA Moscow players
HC CSK VVS Samara players
HC Lada Togliatti players
Severstal Cherepovets players
Living people
Metallurg Magnitogorsk players
Russian ice hockey right wingers
Salavat Yulaev Ufa players
Sportspeople from Tolyatti